Terrence Patrick (born July 7, 1982) is a former American professional Canadian football defensive end who played in the Canadian Football League (CFL). He played college football at Mercyhurst.

Early life and high school
Patrick was born in The Bronx and attended Mount Saint Michael Academy, where he played basketball and football. He was named All-Catholic High School Athletic Association in football as a junior and senior.

College career
Patrick played four seasons for the Mercyhurst Lakers. He was named honorable mention All-Great Lakes Intercollegiate Athletic Conference (GLIAC) in his junior season after recording 36 tackles with 4.5 sacks. As a senior he was named second team All-GLIAC after recording 21.0 tackles for loss and 8.5 sacks. Patrick finished his collegiate career with 152 tackles, 36 tackles for loss and 17 sacks.

Professional career
Patrick was signed by the Calgary Stampeders of the Canadian Football League (CFL) in 2005. He made 20 defensive tackles, three tackles for a loss and had two sacks as a rookie. He was cut by Calgary at the end of training camp in 2008. He made 93 defensive tackles with 13 sacks over 49 games with the Stampeders. Patrick was signed by the Hamilton Tiger-Cats on July 1, 2008. He finished the season with 37 tackles and three sacks and was released at the end of the season. Patrick finished his CFL career with 133 total tackles, 17 sacks and three fumbles recovered in 66 games.

References

1982 births
Living people
Canadian football defensive linemen

American football defensive ends
Calgary Stampeders players
Mercyhurst Lakers football players
Hamilton Tiger-Cats players
Sportspeople from the Bronx
Players of American football from New York City
Players of Canadian football from New York (state)